Sabitha Jayaraj is an Indian costume designer and actress, who works in Malayalam cinema.

Career 
Sabitha started off her career as a costume designer in the Malayalam film industry in the 90s. She worked as a designer in 9 Malayalam feature films as well as a Hindi feature film, one of which Kannaki (film), won her the Kerala State Award for Best Costume Design. Later on she started appearing in small roles in films and took up the lead role in Pakarnnattam opposite Jayaram.
In 2017 she appeared in the short film, Prakriti, told through the point of view of a photographer, played by herself, who is on a tour of Kuttanad.
She played the role Moly a compassionate mother in Jayaraj's award-winning movie Ottal.

Personal life 
Sabitha Jayaraj is married to filmmaker Jayaraj and has collaborated in several of his works. They have two children together, Dhanu Jayaraj and Keshav Jayaraj.

Filmography
 Gulmohar (2008) as Sunila teacher
 Of the People (2008) as Sreelakshmi
 Madhya Venal (2009) as Yashodha
 The Train (2011) as Suhana
 Naayika (2011) as Sangeetha
 Pakarnnattam (2012) as Meera
 Camel Safari (2013) as Suparna Deedi
 Ottaal (2015) as Moly
 Prakriti (2017) (Short film)
 Bhayanakam (2018) as Anthony's wife
 Roudram 2018 (2019) as Pennamma
 Backpackers (2021) as Lakshmi
 Haasyam (2022) as Kathrina

Producer
 The Guard (2001)

References 

1974 births
Living people
Actresses in Malayalam cinema